Adriano Tuzi (born 1906, date of death unknown) was an Italian rower. He competed in the men's double sculls event at the 1928 Summer Olympics.

References

External links
 

1906 births
Year of death missing
Italian male rowers
Olympic rowers of Italy
Rowers at the 1928 Summer Olympics
Place of birth missing